The Honorary Diploma of the Verkhovna Rada of Ukraine is an award of the Verkhovna Rada (parliament) of Ukraine  for significant contribution to any sphere of life, outstanding socio-political activities, services to the Ukrainian people in promoting and strengthening Ukraine as a democratic, social, legal state, implementing measures to ensure rights and freedoms of citizens, development of democracy, parliamentarism and civil harmony in society, and active participation in legislative activities.

Laureates

References

Awards of the Verkhovna Rada of Ukraine
 Laureates of the Honorary Diploma of the Verkhovna Rada of Ukraine
Ukrainian awards
Badges